Christophe Geiger is a lecturer in intellectual property law, as well as current Director General of the Centre for International Intellectual Property Studies (CEIPI) at the University of Strasbourg.

References

French legal scholars
Academic staff of the University of Strasbourg
Living people
Year of birth missing (living people)
Place of birth missing (living people)